Sir Charles Wetherell (1770 – 17 August 1846) was an English lawyer, politician and judge.

Wetherell was born in Oxford, the third son of Reverend Nathan Wetherell, of Durham, Master of the University College and Vice-Chancellor of the University of Oxford. His mother was Richarda Croke (1743?-1812), sister of Sir Alexander Croke, of Studley Priory, Oxfordshire.

Wetherell was Member of Parliament (MP) for a considerable period, representing Rye from 1812 to 1813, Shaftesbury from 1813 to 1818, Oxford from 1820 to 1826. He was elected MP for Hastings in 1826 but had to stand down when appointed Attorney-General. He represented Plympton Erle from December 1826 to 1830 and Boroughbridge from 1830 to 1832.

He was Solicitor-General between 1824 and 1826 and Attorney General between 20 September 1826 and 27 April 1827 and again between 19 February 1828 and 29 June 1829. In May 1829, Wetherell made a violent speech in opposition to Catholic Emancipation, and was dismissed by the Duke of Wellington. He was Recorder of Bristol during the riots of 1831. From 1835 up to his death in 1846 he was Chancellor of Durham.

Wetherell was twice married, first, in 1826, with his cousin Jane Sarah Elizabeth Croke (1804–1831). They had a son, Charles, who died in infancy. In 1838 he married Harriet Elizabeth, daughter of Colonel Warneford.

References

https://www.menloschool.org/live/profiles/198-charles-stanley-wetherell

External links 
 

1770 births
1846 deaths
Attorneys General for England and Wales
Members of the Parliament of the United Kingdom for English constituencies
Fellows of the Royal Society
UK MPs 1812–1818
UK MPs 1820–1826
UK MPs 1826–1830
UK MPs 1830–1831
UK MPs 1831–1832
Solicitors General for England and Wales
Members of the Parliament of the United Kingdom for Plympton Erle